Reuben Wallace McCollum House is a historic home located at Reidsville, Rockingham County, North Carolina. It was completed in 1928, and is a one-story, double pile, Rustic-style log house.  Also on the property is a one-story-with-loft log house dated between about 1850 and 1875 and renovated about 1921.

It was listed on the National Register of Historic Places in 2003.

References

Log houses in the United States
Houses on the National Register of Historic Places in North Carolina
Houses completed in 1928
Houses in Rockingham County, North Carolina
National Register of Historic Places in Rockingham County, North Carolina
Log buildings and structures on the National Register of Historic Places in North Carolina